The Party of Socialists of the Republic of Moldova (PSRM) is a democratic socialist political party in Moldova. A populist party, it holds Eurosceptic and Russophilian views, both of which are reflected by its long-time former leader Igor Dodon. It is contrasted to like-minded centre-left European parties for its conservative views on social issues, reflecting the country's strong social conservatism and the influence of the Moldovan Orthodox Church.

Between 2005 and 2011, it was known as the Party of Socialists of Moldova "Motherland" (Partidul Socialiștilor din Moldova «Patria-Rodina», PSMPR). In 2021, the Electoral Bloc of Communists and Socialists was formed with the Party of Communists of the Republic of Moldova with the aim of joint participation in the 2021 Moldovan parliamentary election. Due to its promotion of Moldovan language, the party has been described by the media in neighbouring Romania as "anti-Romanian".

History 
The PSRM was founded in 1997 by members of the Socialist Party of Moldova. The founding congress took place on 29 June 1997 in Chișinău. Veronica Abramciuc and Eduard Smirnov were elected as co-chairmen of the new party.

The party obtained 0.59% of votes in 1998 Moldovan parliamentary election, failing to elect any representative. In 2001 Moldovan parliamentary election, the party formed the electoral bloc Unity with the Republican Party of Moldova; it obtained 0.46% of votes, failing to elect any representative. In 2006 elections the party formed the Electoral Bloc Motherland with the Socialist Party of Moldova; the bloc obtained 4.9% of votes and did not elect any representatives. The party did not participate in 2009 and 2010 parliamentary elections, endorsing the Party of Communists of the Republic of Moldova (PCRM). Party chairman Veronica Abramciuc was included in PCRM list and elected to the Parliament of the Republic of Moldova. In 2011, Igor Dodon, former member of the PCRM, joined the party, and was elected as its chairman on 18 December 2011. Subsequently, a Socialist Group, which included Dodon, Veronica Abramciuc, and Zinaida Greceanîi, was set up in parliament.

The party won the 2014 Moldovan parliamentary election with over 20% of the vote. The party remained in opposition, as two centre-right, pro-EU parties managed to form a minority government (Gaburici Cabinet) with the external support of the PCRM.

In the 2016 Moldovan presidential election, Dodon was elected as the new President of Moldova. Following the election, Dodon stepped down as party chairman and was replaced by Zinaida Greceanîi. After being defeated in the 2020 Moldovan presidential election, Dodon returned as the party's chairman. For the 2021 Moldovan parliamentary election, it formed an electoral alliance (Electoral Bloc of Communists and Socialists) with the PCRM, which was defeated by the liberal, centre-right Party of Action and Solidarity.

Political positions 
The party describes itself as democratic socialist. It holds left-wing politics on fiscal issues and more conservative views on socio-cultural issues, and has an anti-NATO, anti-European Union, and pro-Russian stance. Party members support naming the state language Moldovan. Mariana Vasilache, journalist of the Romanian Radio Broadcasting Company, has described the party as a promoter of Moldovenism. Despite their support for Moldovan sovereignty, several party members and Members of the Parliament such as Alla Dolință, Anatolie Labuneț, Adrian Lebedinschi, Corneliu Furculița, Ghenadi Mitriuc, and Radu Mudreac have Romanian citizenship.

Reflecting the country's strong social conservatism, the party promotes family values and holds traditionalist views in regards to LGBT rights in Moldova, which is in contrast to left-leaning parties in Europe. In 2016, the party organized the Family Festival/March to counter-protest the "Without Fear" March organized by GENDERDOC-M in Chișinău. Some Moldovan and Romanian journalists also described the party as authoritarian. Critics also claim that the PSRM-affiliated media promotes fake news and pro-Russian propaganda.

In 2015, Igor Dodon stated that he wanted the PSRM to join the Socialist International. In April 2021 the party submitted a request to join the organisation.

The PSRM hold the West and Ukraine responsible for the Russo-Ukrainian War. Some journalists also labelled the party as anti-Western.

Members of the Executive Committee 

 Vlad Batrîncea – Executive Secretary; Deputy Speaker of the Parliament
 Olga Cebotari
 Grigore Novac – MP; Deputy Chair of the Parliamentary faction
 Adela Răileanu – MP
 Maxim Lebedinschi

Party leaders 
 Eduard Smirnov and Veronica Abramciuc (co-chairs, 1997–2005)
 Veronica Abramciuc (2005–2011)
 Igor Dodon (2011–2016)
 Zinaida Greceanîi (2016–2020)
 Igor Dodon (2020–2021)
 position abolished (since 2021)

Electoral results 
The PSRM participated in the Moldovan parliamentary elections in 1998 and 2001 without success. In the 2005 Moldovan parliamentary election, the party contested as part of the Electoral Bloc Motherland and received 4.97% votes, which was not sufficient to enter parliament as it did not pass the electoral threshold of 6.0%. At the April–July 2009 and the 2010 parliamentary elections, it supported the Party of Communists of the Republic of Moldova (PCRM). Its leader Veronica Abramciuc was included on the PCRM candidates list.

Parliament

Presidency

Local elections

District and municipal councils

Mayors

References

External links 
 Official website 
 e-democracy.md

1997 establishments in Moldova
Democratic socialist parties in Europe
Eurosceptic parties in Moldova
Political parties established in 1997
Political parties in Moldova
Socialist parties in Moldova
Social conservative parties
Russian political parties in Moldova
Anti-Romanian sentiment